The Battle of Consuegra was a battle of the Spanish Reconquista fought on 15 August 1097 near the village of Consuegra in the province of Castile-La Mancha between the Castilian and Leonese army of Alfonso VI and the Almoravids under Yusuf ibn Tashfin. The battle soon turned into Almoravid victory, with the Leónese dead including the son of El Cid, Diego Rodríguez. Alfonso, with some Leónese, retreated into the castle of Consuegra, which was besieged for eight days until the Almoravids withdrew to the south.

References
The Library of Iberian Resources Online
Aisha Bewley's Islamic Home Page
  Official Web site of The Battle of Consuegra 

11th century in Al-Andalus
Consuegra 1097
Consuegra
Consuegra
Consuegra
Consuegra
1097 in Europe
11th century in the Kingdom of León
History of the province of Toledo